Excellence and equity is a relatively popular but ambiguously employed term in the field of contemporary education. It is sometimes used to invoke the notion of equality in education; "put your passion for equality into action". More often, however, educational equity itself is a term used to specifically exclude equality of outcome and instead emphasise the provision of appropriate resources to enable all students to fully exploit their own potential. In this context, excellence is generally used with a self-explanatory meaning when combined with equity; the tension between the two words implies a compromise between aiming for conventional notions of excellence and creating maximum opportunities for social justice and inclusion. This often involves a re-framing or queering of conventional notions of social justice within an educational context.

For some scholars, such as Carol Ann Tomlinson, excellence and equity in education involves the adoption of strategies that aim for their practical balance in schools. It is argued that without such balance the output of the educational system will be compromised through a resource emphasis on excellence since this implies lower resources for issues grounded in social justice, such as access.

Some usages of the term, and variations upon it, appear to contradict the meaning applied by authors such as Tomlinson. The notion, for example, that excellence can be achieved through equity rejects, consciously or otherwise, the notion of the need to balance the two concepts. In addition, while conceptions such as Tomlinson's convey a social justice imperative, the rejection of equality implied by equity appears to present the latter as a mechanism of efficiently ensuring unequal social outcomes based upon genetic traits with that process stripped of the perceived distortion created by social inequality. This appears to suggest a meritocratic framing, which may be seen variously as consistent with both a social justice narrative and also a neo-liberal one.

Excellence and equity may therefore presently be best understood as a widely-used but relatively immature intellectual idea which remains in development.

References

See also
Educational equity

Civil rights of students
Education reform